The Bulimba Cup was an Australian rugby league football competition contested by the Brisbane, Ipswich and Toowoomba representative rugby league sides during the mid 20th century. In 1931, a team from Lismore, New South Wales participated. It was first contested in 1925 but was cancelled in 1972 due to waning public interest caused by a greater focus on Brisbane club football.

The Bulimba Cup trophy was provided by the Queensland Brewery.

The competition was normally played as a round-robin with each team playing each other twice. On the rare occasions when teams finished evenly at the conclusion of 6 games, a playoff was held to determine the winner. From 1969 onwards, a final was held.

In 2005 the Queensland Rugby League issued a commemorative jersey to celebrate the 80th anniversary of this competition.

Winners
The competition has been won by Brisbane 19 times, Toowoomba 16 times and Ipswich 11 times.
List of Bulimba Cup Champions:
 1925: Toowoomba
 1926: Ipswich
 1927: Toowoomba
 1928: Toowoomba
 1929: Ipswich
 1930: Brisbane 
 1931: Brisbane defeated Toowoomba 24-13
 1932: Brisbane
 1933: Ipswich
 1934: Ipswich
 1935: Ipswich
 1936: Toowoomba
 1937: Ipswich
 1938: Ipswich
 1939: Ipswich
 1940: Brisbane
 1941: Brisbane
 1942: Not contested due to WWII
 1943: Not contested due to WWII
 1944: Toowoomba
 1945: Toowoomba
 1946: Brisbane
 1947: Brisbane
 1948: Brisbane
 1949: Brisbane
 1950: Brisbane
 1951: Toowoomba
 1952: Toowoomba
 1953: Toowoomba
 1954: Toowoomba
 1955: Toowoomba
 1956: Toowoomba
 1957: Ipswich
 1958: Ipswich defeated Toowoomba 15-10
 1959: Toowoomba defeated Ipswich 10-7
 1960: Toowoomba
 1961: Brisbane
 1962: Brisbane 
 1963: Brisbane
 1964: Brisbane
 1965: Toowoomba
 1966: Ipswich defeated Brisbane 7-2
 1967: Brisbane
 1968: Brisbane
 1969: Brisbane defeated Toowoomba 27-8
 1970: Toowoomba defeated Brisbane 18-17
 1971: Brisbane defeated Toowoomba 22-13
 1972: Brisbane defeated Toowoomba 55-2 at Lang Park

Records

Most games played

Most tries scored

Most points scored

References

External links
 

Defunct rugby league competitions in Queensland